Peringandur  is a village in Thrissur district in the state of Kerala, India.Talappilly, Chavakkad, Kodungallur, Mukundapuram, Thrissur etc. are the nearest towns / cities to Peringandoor village. As per Census 2011 information the village code of Peringandoor village is 627780.

Demographics
 India census, Peringandur had a population of 5434 with 2624 males and 2810 females.

References

Villages in Thrissur district